Dead Girl is a comic book character.

Dead Girl may also refer to:
"Dead Girl", a song by Acid Bath from Paegan Terrorism Tactics
The Dead Girl, a 2006 film
Deadgirl, a 2008 horror film
Dead Girls, a 1992 novel by Richard Calder
Dead Girls (book), a 2002 short story collection by Nancy Lee
Dead Girl (film), a 1996 film by Adam Coleman Howard
"The Dead Girls", a song by Orchestral Manoeuvres in the Dark from the album The Pacific Age
The Dead Girl (1990), a true crime book by Melanie Thernstrom

See also
Dead woman (disambiguation)